The 2011 Malaysian Open (also known as the '2011 Proton Malaysian Open' for sponsorship reasons) was a tennis tournament played on indoor hard courts. It was the third edition of the Proton Malaysian Open, and was classified as an ATP World Tour 250 Series of the 2011 ATP World Tour. It took place at the Bukit Jalil Sports Complex in Kuala Lumpur, Malaysia. Janko Tipsarević won the singles title.

Champions

Men's singles

 Janko Tipsarević defeated  Marcos Baghdatis, 6–4, 7–5
 It was Tipsarevic's 1st career title.

Men's doubles

 Eric Butorac /  Jean-Julien Rojer defeated  František Čermák /  Filip Polášek, 6–1, 6–3

Entrants

Seeds

 Seeds are based on the rankings of 19 September 2011.

Other entrants
The following players received wildcards into the singles main draw
  Marcos Baghdatis
  Matthew Ebden
  David Goffin

The following players received entry from the qualifying draw:

  Rik de Voest
  Teymuraz Gabashvili
  Mikhail Ledovskikh
  Marinko Matosevic

References

External links
 Official website

Proton Malaysian Open
Proton Malaysian Open
2011 in Malaysian tennis